John Grindrod is an author of books about British architecture. He is from Croydon, London.

Works
His first book Concretopia (2013) covers architecture in the post-war consensus period.

His second book Outskirts (2017) is a mix of memoir and investigation of the Metropolitan Green Belt, which surrounds New Addington where Grindrod's family lived. This book was nominated for the 2018 Wainwright Prize.

Grindrod also works for publisher Faber and Faber. He has written for the Guardian, Financial Times, the Twentieth Century Society Magazine and The Modernist.

Bibliography
Concretopia, 2013
Outskirts, 2017
How To Love Brutalism, 2018
Iconicon: A Journey Around the Landmark Buildings of Contemporary Britain, 2022 (Faber)

References

British writers
Living people
Year of birth missing (living people)